Murton is a small village situated in Tyne and Wear in the North East of England and is part of the urban conurbation of North Tyneside. The village is separated by fields from the nearby areas of West Monkseaton, New York, Earsdon and Shiremoor.

The village contains a public house, the Robin Hood, and an equestrian centre.

Murton Farmhouse on the New York Road is a Grade II listed building, with parts dating from the 18th century.

References

External links
 Murton Network Village - an exemplar sustainable regeneration scheme

Villages in Tyne and Wear
Metropolitan Borough of North Tyneside